Rue des Pignons was a Canadian French-language TV series which ran from 1966 to 1977. Radio-Canada has reportedly lost most of the episodes of the series, only managing to trace about 35 of the 414 episodes from 1966 to 1977. The program's theme song was composed and recorded by Pierre Brabant who also played much of the show's background music.

Plot

The intrigue develops around a typical family of a working district of Montreal, with stories concerning knowledge and friends of the members of the family and other residents of the surroundings of the streets of Pignons.

Cast

 Rolland Bédard -Anatole Marsouin
 Juliette Béliveau -Bijou Bousquet
 Jean Duceppe -Emery Lafeuille
 Louise Deschatelets -Doudou Désiré

References

External links
 Archives

Television shows set in Montreal
Ici Radio-Canada Télé original programming
1966 Canadian television series debuts
1977 Canadian television series endings
1960s Canadian drama television series
1970s Canadian drama television series